Anne Wood Price Bradstreet ( – 1707) was the wife of Dudley Bradstreet and accused "witch" during the Salem Witch Trials.

Salem Witch Trials 
Dudley Bradstreet was accused of witchcraft after he refused to issue warrants for accused witches.  Anne and her husband fled the area to avoid arrest.

Family 
Anne was the daughter of Richard and Anne (Priddeth) Wood of Barbados.  She first married Theodore Price of Andover and had the following children:
 Elizabeth, married Thomas Barnard.
Next, she married Dudley Bradstreet, son of Simon Bradstreet and Anne Dudley Bradstreet.  They had the following children:
 Margaret, married Job Tyler, son of Moses Tyler.
 Dudley, married Mary Wainwright.
 Anne, died in infancy.
Bradstreet is an ancestor of U.S. President Herbert Hoover.

References 

1650 births
1707 deaths
People accused of witchcraft
People of the Salem witch trials